Dr. Oscar Kashala Lukumuena (born August 4, 1954) is a politician in the Democratic Republic of the Congo and was a candidate in the 2006 presidential election.

Doctor Kashala is a graduate of Harvard University and has held senior executive positions in the pharmaceutical industry. He previously took a leave of absence in order to campaign in the 2006 elections, after years of residence in the United States. Dr. Kashala announced his candidacy in the Democratic Republic of the Congo's 2011 presidential election.

UREC participated in the 2006 Elections in the DRC.

Biography 
Oscar Kashala was born on August 4, 1954, in Lubumbashi, Haut-Katanga District, from Congolese parents. Son of a retired military sergeant in the Force Publique, the Congolese Army under Belgian colonization, Oscar Kashala was raised in an environment that focused on strict discipline, Christian faith, hard work, excellence in education and family values. He excelled as a student and as a boy scout.

Kashala graduated from Kinshasa University Medical School in 1980 with honors, and trained in internal medicine and pathology at the University of Kinshasa, then at the University of Lausanne and University of Geneva Medical Schools.  In 1986, the World Health Organization (WHO/AFRO) awarded him a fellowship for medical oncology in Boston. Then he obtained a fellowship in cancer biology at Harvard University, Boston.  This was followed by admission into a doctoral program in cancer biology and immunology in a combined degree program (Harvard University and Massachusetts Institute of Technology). He received a Doctor of Science degree from Harvard University in 1992.

In May 2006, thirty members of Kashala's security detail were accused of plotting to overthrow interim Congo president Joseph Kabila. Kashala and the international community dismissed the allegations as a blatant attempt by Kabila's administration to intimidate him.

In the 2006 election, Kashala finished in fifth place with 4% of votes in the first round of voting, well short of Jean-Pierre Bemba's 20% and Joseph Kabila's 45%.

Personal life 
Kashala is married to Prudence Kashala.  They have raised a family of 8 children.

Dr. Kashala is the head of Asterko which is a holdings company that has many dealings around the world mainly for profit ventures.

References

1954 births
Living people
People from Lubumbashi
Democratic Republic of the Congo politicians
Harvard University alumni
Candidates for President of the Democratic Republic of the Congo